is a Japanese shōjo manga artist who writes primarily for Margaret and Young You. She made her debut as a manga artist in 1973. She won the 1992 Kodansha Manga Award for shōjo for Uchi no Mama ga iu Koto ni wa, and her manga Ichigatsu ni wa Christmas ("Christmas in January") was adapted as an anime OVA in 1991.

References

External links 
 Profile  at The Ultimate Manga Page
 Mariko Iwadate fan site 

Japanese female comics artists
Women manga artists
Female comics writers
Winner of Kodansha Manga Award (Shōjo)
1957 births
People from Sapporo
Manga artists from Hokkaido
Living people